Tigers of the Sea is a collection of fantasy short stories by Robert E. Howard about the pirate Cormac Mac Art, a Gael who joins a band of Danish Vikings during the reign of King Arthur. (Historically, Cormac Mac Art is the name of a famous High King of Ireland, but among the many legends told of him there is no reference to him having been a pirate.)

Tigers of the Sea was first published in 1974 by Donald M. Grant, Publisher, Inc. in an edition of 3,400 copies. The stories feature Howard's character Cormac Mac Art; the volume was edited by Richard L. Tierney.

Except for one, the stories are pure historical fiction, dealing with struggles between various groups of human beings waged by mundane human weapons. The exception is "The Temple of Abomination", in which Cormac Mac Art and his Viking fellows defeat the last of the monstrous Serpent Men, whom King Kull fought in the much earlier Howardian cycle.

Contents
 Introduction, by Richard L. Tierney
 "Tigers of the Sea" (by Howard, completed by Tierney)
 "Swords of the Northern Sea"
 "The Night of the Wolf"
 "The Temple of Abomination" (by Howard, completed by Tierney)

Robert E. Howard Library Vol. I: Cormac Mac Art.
The stories of Cormac Mac Art were also printed by Baen Books in 1995. This edition included the same stories from Tigers of the Sea with an additional new story, "The Land Towards Sunset", published by author David Drake

Cormac Mac Art and Wulfhere the Skull-Splitter

Originally, Cormac Mac Art (nicknamed an Cluiun - "The Wolf") was a member of the Irish Reivers - bold pirates who range far among the ruins of the Roman Empire, reaching Spain and on occasion even Egypt, though their ships are less sound than those of the Scandinavian Vikings. Usually, Reivers and Vikings are on bad terms with each other - being competitors for the same loot.

However, at one point, Cormac Mac Art (for unspecified reasons) became an outlaw and had to leave Ireland in a hurry. Soon, he found refuge and a new home among the Danish Vikings led by Wulfhere the Skull-Splitter. He became Wulfhere's right hand man, the two of them complementing each other and working harmoniously together.

The giant Wulfhere is a bellicose and formidable fighter, quite deserving of his nickname. He is impetuous, easily roused, and on bad terms with most of the other Viking leaders - though not overtly cruel and capable at times of surprising compassion. Cormac Mac Art, though a formidable swordsman in his own right when in need, is a more subtle man: well-informed on the affairs of the numerous kingdoms, tribes, and factions inhabiting the turbulent British Islands and beyond. He's also a fluent speaker of many languages, a competent spy able to infiltrate enemy strongholds, and the originator of complicated or intricate plots. Cormac has many enemies, Irish as well as Scandinavian, who would dearly love to put an end to his career - but he manages to elude them, again and again.

Wulfhere appreciates Cormac's advice and mostly follows it, while Cormac accepts Wulfhere's leadership of the band and has no intention of challenging it. Together, they go through many dangerous adventures and emerge from various near-fatal traps.

Like most Irish people of his time, Cormac is a Pagan, a staunch believer of the Druidic religion, and his opinion towards Christianity is far from positive - though in "The Temple of Abomination" he (like his Danish fellows) comes to respect the courage and dedication of a Christian priest whom they save from the monstrous snake-man.

Andrew Offutt novels

Andrew Offutt continued Cormac Mac Art's adventures beyond where Howard left off, writing no less than six such novels (some of them in collaboration with Keith Taylor).
 Sword of the Gael (1975)
 The Undying Wizard (1976)
 The Sign of the Moonbow (1977)
 The Mists of Doom (1977)
 When Death Birds Fly (1980, with Keith Taylor)
 The Tower of Death (1982, with Keith Taylor)

Arthurian background

In The Temple of Abomination Cormac tells his Danish companions about King Arthur - a view significantly different from that seen in the Arthurian legends.

"... most of the chiefs are gathering about Arthur Pendragon for a great concerted drive. Pendragon — ha! He's no more Uther Pendragon's son than you [Wulfhere] are. Uther was a black-bearded madman — more Roman than Briton and more Gaul than Roman. Arthur is as fair as Eric here. And he's pure Celt — a waif from one of the wild western tribes that never bowed to Rome. It was Lancelot who put it into his head to make himself king — else he had still been no more than a wild chief raiding the borders."

"Has he become smooth and polished like the Romans were?"

"Arthur? Ha! One of your Danes might seem a gentlewoman beside him. He's a shock-headed savage with a love for battle." Cormac grinned ferociously and touched his scars. "By the blood of the gods, he has a hungry sword! It's little gain we reivers from Erin have gotten on his coasts!"

"Would I could cross steel with him," grunted Wulfhere, thumbing the flaring edge of his great axe. "What of Lancelot?"

"A renegade Gallo-Roman who has made an art of throat-cutting. He varies reading Petronius with plotting and intriguing. Gawaine is a pure-blooded Briton like Arthur, but he has Romanish leanings. You'd laugh to see him aping Lancelot — but he fights like a blood-hungry devil. Without those two, Arthur would have been no more than a bandit chief. He can neither read nor write."

"What of that?" rumbled the Dane. "Neither can I. ..."

Though Cormac obviously had some direct contact with Arthur and Lancelot before his exile from Ireland, they never appear onstage in the stories about him - most of which take place much further to the north, in the islands around Scotland. As depicted in the stories, in his own time Arthur and his court were not as much in the center of attention as the later myth would imply, since there was very much else going on in the British Islands. There were the Saxons, Angles, and Jutes pushing westwards against the Britons; further north, the Gaels pushing eastwards against the Picts; and pirates and rovers, Irish and Scandinavian, constantly raiding everybody. Each of these groups could at any moment come into conflict with any of the others, or burst into internecine conflict between different factions; especially, among the Scandinavian Vikings, there is a deep hatred and enmity between Danes and Norwegians. Alliances of convenience might also be formed from time to time - for example, Vikings are seen as occasionally forming alliances with Britons against the Saxons. Obviously, the Arthurian tales passed on to later generation would reflect only a small fraction of all these complicated conflicts occurring during Arthur's time.

Such an "outsider" view of King Arthur is very rare in the extensive Arthurian Literature, Medieval or Modern. Virtually the only other example of such an approach is Alfred Duggan's Conscience of the King, which tries to reconstruct how Arthur was seen by his Saxon foes.

References

External links
Review on the Robert E. Howard Angelfire page (1)
Review on the Robert E. Howard Angelfire page (2)

1974 short story collections
Short story collections by Robert E. Howard
Fantasy short story collections
Fictional Vikings
Fictional Irish people
Modern Arthurian fiction
Donald M. Grant, Publisher books